Vissi is a village in Nõo Parish, Tartu County in eastern Estonia. Lake Vissi is located in the village.

References

 

Villages in Tartu County